Patrick Estate is a rural locality in the Somerset Region, Queensland, Australia. In the  Patrick Estate had a population of 199 people.

Geography 
The Brisbane River forms the eastern boundary of the locality. Lockyer Creek forms part of the western boundary before passing through the locality from west to east to its confluence with the Brisbane River.

History 
The locality is named after William Patrick and John Patrick, who selected land on the north side of lower reaches of Lockyer Creek on 22 July 1868.

Patrick Estate State School opened on 28 January 1925.

In the  Patrick Estate had a population of 199 people.

Education 
Patrick Estate State School is a government primary (Prep-6) school for boys and girls at 816 Mahon Road.
In 2016, the school had an enrolment of 36 students with 4 teachers (3 full-time equivalent) and 6 non-teaching staff (3 full-time equivalent).
In 2018, the school had an enrolment of 42 students with 3 teachers (2 full-time equivalent) and 9 non-teaching staff (4 full-time equivalent).

References

Further reading 
 

Suburbs of Somerset Region
Localities in Queensland